The Colossus  of Constantine was a many times life-size acrolithic early-4th-century statue depicting the Roman emperor Constantine the Great (c. 280–337), commissioned by himself, which originally occupied the west apse of the Basilica of Maxentius on the Via Sacra, near the Forum Romanum in Rome. Surviving portions of the Colossus now reside in the courtyard of the Palazzo dei Conservatori, now part of the Capitoline Museums, on the Capitoline Hill, above the west end of the Forum.

Description
The great head, arms and legs of the Colossus were carved from white marble, while the rest of the body consisted of a brick core and wooden framework, possibly covered with gilded bronze.  Judging by the size of the remaining pieces, the seated, enthroned figure would have been about 12 meters (40 feet) high.  The head is about 2 meters tall and each foot is over 2 meters long. 

The statue's right hand is said by Eusebius to have held "a trophy of the Saviour's passion with the saving sign of the Cross", possibly therefore in the form of a staff with the sacred monogram XP affixed to it. Medals minted by Constantine at about this time show him so decorated. Eusebius further records the Latin inscription engraved below the statue, which may be translated as follows:

Through this sign of salvation, which is the true symbol of goodness, I rescued your city and freed it from the tyrant's yoke, and through my act of liberation I restored the Senate and People of Rome to their ancient renown and splendour.

The great head is carved in a typical, abstract, Constantinian style ('hieratic emperor style') of late Roman portrait statues, whereas the other body parts are naturalistic, even down to callused toes and bulging forearm veins.   The head was perhaps meant to convey the transcendence of the other-worldly nature of the Emperor over the human sphere, notable in its larger-than-life-size eyes which gaze toward eternity from a rigidly impersonal, frontal face.  The treatment of the head shows a synthesis of individualistic portraiture: aquiline nose, deep jaw and prominent chin characteristic of all images of Constantine, with the trends of late Roman portraiture which focus on symbolism and abstraction, rather than detail.

In this great public work, Constantine is portrayed in unapproachable grandeur, like the effigy of a god, although he is really intended to reflect the Christian deity. According to Michael Grant:

History

The Basilica of Maxentius, on the northern boundary of the Forum, was begun in 307 by co-Emperor Maxentius. Constantine completed the Basilica after he defeated Maxentius at the Battle of the Milvian Bridge in 312. Constantine seems to have reorientated the building, changing the site of the principal entrance and adding a new northern apse. With these changes, including the great statue in the west apse, Constantine publicly and visibly declared his overthrow of his vanquished adversary. Precise dating of the statue itself is problematical; it has been suggested that a date of 312–315 for the initial creation of the statue is likely from political considerations, whilst a substantial reworking of the features some time after 325 is indicated on art-historical grounds.

The Colossus was pillaged sometime in Late Antiquity, most likely for the bronze body portions. The marble portions of the statue were brought to light in 1486. The surviving remnants were later removed from the Basilica and placed in the nearby Palazzo dei Conservatori Courtyard by Michelangelo, who was working in the area. Strangely, there are two right hands (with upraised index fingers) amongst the remains of the statue, which differ slightly. It has been proposed that the statue was re-worked at some time late in Constantine's reign and a hand holding a sceptre was replaced by a hand holding a Christian symbol.

The marble fragments underwent restoration during 2000–2001. Between 6 and 10 February 2006, a 3D laser scan of the fragments was carried out on behalf of the Land of Rhineland-Palatinate in collaboration with the Capitoline Museums in Rome.  Both reconstruction and castings were displayed from 2 June to 4 November 2007 as part of the major cultural and historical "Constantine the Great" Exhibition in Trier, Germany.

See also
 Bronze colossus of Constantine

References

Further reading
 Weitzmann, Kurt, ed., Age of spirituality: late antique and early Christian art, third to seventh century, no. 11, 1979, Metropolitan Museum of Art, New York, ; full text available online from The Metropolitan Museum of Art Libraries

External links

 The Constantine Project  at ArcTron (3D laser imaging)
 

315 establishments
4th-century Roman sculptures
Ancient Greek and Roman colossal statues
Ancient Roman buildings and structures in Rome
Buildings and structures completed in the 4th century
Sculptures in the Capitoline Museums
Cultural depictions of Constantine the Great
Late Roman Empire sculptures
Roman sculpture portraits of emperors
Statues of monarchs